Amerikiwhati Island is a small island in the Marlborough administrative region of New Zealand. It lies in Queen Charlotte Sound where it is an extension of the ridge dividing Ahitarakihi Bay from Waikakaramea Bay on Arapaoa Island.
The island measures approximately 300 metres by 70 metres.

See also

 List of islands of New Zealand
 List of islands
 Desert island

References

Uninhabited islands of New Zealand
Islands of the Marlborough Sounds